Baghestan-e Sofla (also Romanized as Bāghestān-e Soflá; also known as Bāghestān-e Pā’īn and Sar Āsīāb-e Mīrzā) is a village in, and the capital of, Baghestan Rural District, in Eslamiyeh District, Ferdows County, South Khorasan province, Iran. At the 2006 National Census, its population was 610 in 188 households, when it was in the Central District. The following census in 2011 counted 675 people in 221 households. The latest census in 2016 showed a population of 707 people in 223 households.

After the census, Eslamiyeh District was established by combining Baghestan Rural District, Borun Rural District, and the city of Eslamiyeh. At the same time, Baghestan-e Olya's name changed to Baghestan and was raised to the level of a city. Baghestan-e Sofla became the new capital of Baghestan Rural District.

References 

Ferdows County

Populated places in South Khorasan Province

Populated places in Ferdows County